Babylonia valentiana is a species of sea snail, a marine gastropod mollusk, in the family Babyloniidae.

References

valentiana
Gastropods described in 1822